"Wrong Direction" is a song by American singer Hailee Steinfeld and was released by Republic Records on January 1, 2020. The song serves as the lead single from Steinfeld's second EP Half Written Story (2020).

Background and composition
Steinfeld first teased the song's release by posting a picture on social media with the caption "1/1". Later that day she announced the song's title. It is speculated that the song is about Steinfeld's split from ex-boyfriend Niall Horan in December 2018. Its title is also presumed to be aimed at Horan's band One Direction, who are currently on hiatus.

"Wrong Direction" was written by Elizabeth Lowell Boland, Hailee Steinfeld, Skyler Stonestreet and Stephen Kozmeniuk, and was produced by Koz. The song runs for four minutes and eight seconds. Ashley Iasimone of Billboard characterized "Wrong Direction" as "an emotional ballad that addresses a past relationship".

Music video 
The Alexandre Moors-directed music video was released on January 8, 2020, via YouTube premiere.

Credits and personnel 
Credits adapted from Tidal.

Hailee Steinfeld – vocals, songwriting
Koz – production, songwriting, bass guitar, drums, programming, synthesizer
Lowell – songwriting, backing vocals, piano
Skyler Stonestreet – songwriting, backing vocals
Todd Clark – backing vocals
Matt Snell – assistant recording engineering, studio personnel
Phil Hotz – assistant recording engineering, studio personnel
Josh Gudwin – mixing, studio personnel
Drew Jurecka – string arrangement

Track listing

Charts

Certifications

Release history

References 

2020 singles
2020 songs
Hailee Steinfeld songs
Songs written by Hailee Steinfeld
Songs written by Stephen Kozmeniuk
Songs written by Skyler Stonestreet
Songs written by Lowell (musician)
Republic Records singles
Pop ballads